The 1978 UK Championship was a professional non-ranking snooker tournament that took place  between 22 November and 1 December 1978 at the Guild Hall in Preston, England.

The 1978 tournament was the first of twenty UK Championship competitions to be played in Preston's Guildhall. For the first time, the event was sponsored by Coral who continued to sponsor the UK Championship until 1985.

The most dramatic match came in the qualifying rounds when Terry Griffiths, a newly turned professional, was beaten 8–9 by Rex Williams after leading 8–2. The main stage of the championship also provided plenty of surprises. Patsy Fagan, the defending UK champion, went out 7–9 in the first round to David Taylor who, after a decade in the professional ranks, reached his first major final by beating Alex Higgins 9–5 in the semi-finals. In the other half of the draw, Roy Andrewartha beat John Spencer 9–8 and Willie Thorne beat Ray Reardon 9–6 only to collapse 1–9 against Graham Miles, whose 139 break set a tournament record. In the semi-finals it was Miles' turn to collapse 1–9 to Doug Mountjoy who, keeping his best until last, clinched his final victory over Taylor with a break of 120. The BBC televised the final on their Grandstand programme with Ted Lowe commentating the match.

Main draw

Final

Qualifying

Last 24  Best of 17 frames

 David Taylor   9–2   Maurice Parkin 

 John Virgo   9–4   Ray Edmonds 

 John Dunning   9–3   David Greaves 

 Jim Meadowcroft   9–5   Jackie Rea 
 
 Doug Mountjoy   9–5   John Barrie 

 Roy Andrewartha   9–3   Pat Houlihan 

 Rex Williams   9–8   Terry Griffiths 

 Willie Thorne   9–4   Bernard Bennett

Century breaks

 139  Graham Miles
 120, 118  Doug Mountjoy
 101  John Dunning

References

UK Championship (snooker)
UK Championship
UK Championship
UK Championship
UK Championship